N45 may refer to:

Transportation
 N45 (Long Island bus)
 BMW N45, an automobile engine
 Kobelt Airport, in Ulster County, New York, United States
 N-45 National Highway, in Pakistan
 Nebraska Highway 45, in the United States

Military
 , a Grampus-class submarine of the Royal Navy sunk in 1940
 , a T-class submarine of the Royal Navy scrapped in 1947